Vidya Bharathi Vidyalaya is an educational institution situated at Urdor, Kasargod, Kerala, India.

Vidya Bharati schools
Schools in Kasaragod district